Tmesorrhina is a genus of beetle belonging to the family Scarabaeidae.

Species
 Tmesorrhina alpestris Kolbe, 1892
 Tmesorrhina barombina Kolbe, 1892
 Tmesorrhina chireyi Legrand & Antoine, 2003
 Tmesorrhina ganglbaueri Moser, 1913
 Tmesorrhina garnieri Allard, 1993
 Tmesorrhina iris (Fabricius, 1781)
 Tmesorrhina laeta Moser, 1913
 Tmesorrhina laevis Kraatz, 1897
 Tmesorrhina lequeuxi Antoine, 1995
 Tmesorrhina pectoralis Moser, 1905
 Tmesorrhina pilosipes Allard, 1988
 Tmesorrhina runsorica Arrow, 1909
 Tmesorrhina simillima Kraatz, 1880
 Tmesorrhina tridens Duvivier, 1891
 Tmesorrhina viridicincta Moser, 1913
 Tmesorrhina viridicyanea Moser, 1902

Cetoniinae